Flat Foot Stooges is a 1938 short subject directed by Charley Chase starring American slapstick comedy team The Three Stooges (Moe Howard, Larry Fine and Curly Howard). It is the 35th entry in the series released by Columbia Pictures starring the comedians, who released 190 shorts for the studio between 1934 and 1959.

Plot
The trio are firemen (a la 1936's False Alarms) at an engine company No 1 that still employs horse-powered fire engines. Sleazy salesman Mr. Reardon (Dick Curtis) fails to convince Fire Chief Kelly (Chester Conklin) that horse-powered engines are on the way out. His ideas are rejected, and he is sent on his way. Mr. Reardon, however, tries to sabotage the firehouse by committing arson. He drops a can of gunpowder into the old-fashioned pump boiler and the chief's daughter (Lola Jensen) sees him. Reardon chases the girl to stop her from telling her father but accidentally falls and knocks himself out. Reardon does not know that the can has a leak, and a duck has been eating the spilled gunpowder. The duck alights on a window ledge in the station and lays an egg, which falls to the floor and explodes like a hand grenade, starting a fire. The explosion startles the chief's daughter which causes her to fall backwards and knock her head on the bed, unconscious. After having taken the horses to a Turkish bath, when the fire alarm sounds the Stooges try to hook the horses up to the fire engine but only end scaring the horses and having volunteers move the engine. (At a traffic stop the engine blows up but the Stooges and the Volunteers arguing with a traffic policeman (Heinie Conklin) results in nobody getting hurt). Realizing too late that the blaze is coming from their own fire station, the Stooges manage to arrive just in time to save the chief's daughter from the flames. Reardon also jumps from the station but misses the rescue net when the stooges save the girl first; when the girl points out Reardon as the arsonist, he runs away-the Stooges give chase but fall into the hole Reardon made in the street.

Production notes
Filmed on October 25–28, 1938, the title Flat Foot Stooges is a pun on the 1938 jazz song "Flat Foot Floogie (with a Floy Floy)".

A rarity among Stooge shorts, the boys are shown reciting dialogue incorrectly on several occasions, a result of director Charley Chase's rushed directing style. Chase rarely stopped for retakes in an effort to finish a film ahead of schedule.

When Larry slides down the fire pole and is accidentally punched by Moe, he calls himself a "victim of circumstance". This marks the first time a Stooge other than Curly says the line.

Upon realizing they are heading in the wrong direction, Curly quips "Hey, we're doing the Corrigan!", a reference to aviator Douglas "Wrong Way" Corrigan. Corrigan had recently returned from a transcontinental flight from Floyd Bennett Field in Brooklyn, New York to Long Beach, California. Instead of returning to New York, he bypassed it, and headed to Ireland.

Flat Foot Stooges marks the first usage of "Three Blind Mice" as the Stooges' title theme. However, this was not put to permanent use until We Want Our Mummy.

References

External links
 
 

1938 films
1938 comedy films
American black-and-white films
Films directed by Charley Chase
The Three Stooges films
Films about firefighting
Columbia Pictures short films
American slapstick comedy films
1930s English-language films
1930s American films